Edward E. Gnichtel (c. 1868 − December 21, 1933) was a New Jersey businessman and politician.  He was born in Newark and lived in Essex County his whole life.  Early in his career he worked as a traveling salesman for a brush manufacturing company; in 1894 he started his own business, the Newark Brush Company.  In 1901 he was elected to the New Jersey state assembly, and was re-elected in 1902 and 1903.

Other positions he held included Fire Commissioner in Newark, from 1903; Jury Commissioner in Essex County, from 1913; and member of the Newark Board of Health, from 1915.  He became Collector of Internal Revenue in Newark in 1925, and resigned in 1927.  His brother, Frederick W. Gnichtel, was at one point mayor of Trenton.

Footnotes 

1860s births
1933 deaths
Members of the New Jersey General Assembly
Politicians from Newark, New Jersey